is a Japanese professional baseball pitcher for the Hanshin Tigers of Nippon Professional Baseball (NPB). He has played in NPB for the Fukuoka SoftBank Hawks.

Professional career

Fukuoka Softbank Hawks
On October 24, 2013, Kajiya was drafted by the Fukuoka Softbank Hawks in the first overall pick in the 2013 Nippon Professional Baseball draft.  In the 2014 -2015 season, he played in the Western League of NPB's minor leagues and played in informal matches against Shikoku Island League Plus's teams.

On August 26, 2016, Kajiya pitched his debut game as a relief pitcher against the Chiba Lotte Marines. In the 2016 -2017 season, he pitched in four games. In the 2018 season, he pitched in 72 games as a setup man, matching the Hawks' record. And he finished the regular season with a 4–3 win–loss record, a 3.38 ERA, 31 holds, 53 strikeouts in 66 2/3 innings, and he pitched in the 2018 Japan Series. In the 2019 season, Kajiya finished the regular season with 30 games pitched, a 3–1 win–loss record, a 6.00 ERA, and 23 strikeouts in 36 innings. On December 2, 2020, he became a free agent.

Hanshin Tigers
On December 15, 2020, Kajiya signed with Hanshin Tigers of NPB and held a press conference.

References

External links

 NPB.com
14 Ren Kajiya PLAYERS2020 - Fukuoka SoftBank Hawks Official site

1991 births
Living people
Baseball people from Miyazaki Prefecture
Fukuoka SoftBank Hawks players
Japanese baseball players
Nippon Professional Baseball pitchers